4Q or 4q may also refer to:

 4Q, IATA code for Safi Airways
 The fourth quarter of a calendar year
 The fourth quarter of a fiscal year
 A four-quadrant movie, which appeals to all four major demographic quadrants
 The 4Q Mangrenade, a 2006 album by Driller Killer
 A-4Q, a model of  Douglas A-4  Skyhawk
 4Q, designation for one of the Qumran Caves
 4q, an arm of Chromosome 4 (human)
4Q, the production code for the 1977 Doctor Who serial The Face of Evil

See also
Q4 (disambiguation)